Acidicapsa dinghuensis  is a Gram-negative, aerobic and non-motile bacterium from the genus of Acidicapsa which has been isolated from forest soil from the Dinghushan Biosphere Reserve in China.

References 

Acidobacteriota
Bacteria described in 2018